Padam Khola Small Hydropower Station (Nepali: पदम खोला सानो जलविद्युत आयोजना) is a run-of-river hydro-electric plant located in   Dailekh District of Nepal. The flow from Padam River is used to generate 4.8 MW electricity. The design flow is 2.27 m3/s and design head is 243.4 m.

The plant is owned and developed by Dolti Power Company P. Ltd, an IPP of Nepal. The plant started generating electricity from 2018 (2076-09-08BS) The generation licence will expire in 2053 (2109-06-28 BS) after which the plant will be handed over to the government. The power station is connected to the national grid and the electricity is sold to Nepal Electricity Authority.

See also

List of power stations in Nepal

References

Hydroelectric power stations in Nepal
Gravity dams
Run-of-the-river power stations
Dams in Nepal
Irrigation in Nepal
2018 establishments in Nepal
Buildings and structures in Dailekh District